Grigory Khristoforovich von Zass (1797–1883) was a Russian Imperial general who commanded Russian cavalry troops in the Napoleonic Wars and Russo-Circassian War, initially gaining prominence for his genocidal actions against the Circassians, whom he reportedly saw as a "lowly race". He was the founder of Armavir.

In 2003, the Russian Federation controversially erected his statue on former Circassian territories where the Circassian genocide occurred, infuriating Circassians and Circassian nationalist establishments worldwide.

Biography

Early life 
Originally from Westphalia's German nobility, von Zass belonged to an ancient Westphalian family, whose representatives in the 15th century moved to the Baltic region, repeatedly raised weapons under the banners of the Order of the Sword, and in 1710, was among the 52 so-called chivalric families, including the Ungern-Sternbergs and Wrangel family, which took a solemn oath of allegiance to the Russian sovereign, Peter the Great. He was brought up in a private educational institution. In 1813 at the age of fifteen, his father had him enter military service as a cadet in the Grodno Hussar Regiment. He rose through the ranks of the Russian army, particularly during his first taste of battle at the 1813 Battle of Leipzig. He was transferred to the Novgorod division in 1820.

Military career

Napoleonic Wars 
Zass took part in the War of the Sixth Coalition with the Russian army in 1813–1814, in German campaign of 1813 after swearing allegiance to the Tsar, being of Germanic-Baltic descent. He fought at Dresden, Kulm and Leipzig, was awarded the insignia of the Military Order and promoted to cornet, then participated in the battles in the 1814 campaign in north-east France at Brienne, Bar-sur-Aube, Arcis-sur-Aube, Metz, and Fère-Champenoise, and ended the fighting under the walls of Paris. In 1815 he was part of the Russian troops during the second campaign in France in the Hundred Days and took part in the famous parade near Vertus. After the end of the Napoleonic Wars, he served in the Pskov Cuirassier Regiment.

Russo-Turkish War (1828–1829) 
In 1820 he transferred to the Nizhny Novgorod Dragoon Regiment, which fought in the Caucasus. He took part in the Russo-Turkish War of 1828–1829.

Russo-Circassian War 
In 1830 Zass received command of the Mozdok Cossack Regiment as a result of his success in the Russo-Turkish War. With this regiment he undertook several successful expeditions against the Caucasian natives. In a 1832 battle against the Chechens, he was severely wounded while attempting to burn a village and consequentially promoted to colonel.

In 1833, he was appointed commander of the Batalpashinsky section of the Kuban Line. Having studied the military traditions of Caucasian natives and having mastered the tactics of mountain warfare, he tried to seize the initiative and began to carry out regular preventive measures, based on data received from numerous scouts. Active defense was complemented by cruel punitive expeditions, which ended, as a rule, with the extermination of villages. He was appointed as chief commander and given full authority.

In August, he led the first expedition into Circassian territory, destroying as many villages and towns as possible. This was followed by a series of other expeditions. He attacked the Besleney region between November and December, destroying most villages, including the village of the double agent Aytech Qanoqo.

Zass spent a significant amount of money on espionage. During attacks on Circassian land, he never forgot about reconnaissance tasks: his men thoroughly investigated all wooden beams that could serve as enemy shelter, demolished farms, and killed farmers so the enemy would not be able to get food. He made a list of all the Circassians he personally killed. His fearlessness and incredible awareness of the affairs of the Caucasians brought him an otherworldly status among the Circassians, who called Zass "Shaytan" (Satan). Circassian mothers reportedly frightened their children with the name of Zass.

In 1834, Zass sent a report to Rosen detailing his campaign into Circassia. He talks about how he killed three Circassian civilians on their way to fetch grass:

He then talks about how he destroyed a neighborhood:

Zass' main strategy was to intercept and retain the initiative, terrorize the Circassians, and destroy Circassian settlements. After a victory, he would usually burn several villages and seize cattle and horses to show off, acts which he proudly admitted. He paid close attention to the enemy's morale. In his reports, he frequently boasted about the destruction of villages and glorified the mass murder of civilians. The military successes of the regiments led by him were highly appreciated by the high command. He received as a reward several prestigious orders and a golden weapon with the inscription "For Bravery".

He continued to exterminate the Circassian population between 1834 and 1835, particularly in the Abdzakh, Besleney, Shapsug, and Kabardian regions. In 1835, he was promoted. The entire Kuban line was entrusted to his command, in 1836 he was promoted to major general, and in 1840 – to lieutenant general and appointed chief of the right flank of the Caucasian line. On his initiative, new fortifications began to be laid (one of them is called "Zassovsky") and new Orthodox Slavic villages were arranged, which was the beginning of the creation of the Labinskaya line.

Zass loved spreading rumors about himself by exploiting Circassian tribal superstitions. Using various tricks and cutting-edge technology, he was able to convince and deceive the Circassians into thinking that he had various magical abilities, including being bulletproof and able to turn gunpowder into gold. He was known as a magical man who could do anything he wanted to do. As a result, when he attacked, the Circassians believed they had no chance and suffered a significant loss of morale; knowing Zass's cruel methods, they mostly attempted to save their lives rather than fighting.

On 18 August, the Russian army burned the residency of Hajji Tlam, a Circassian elder from the Abdzakh region, and killed his family. As revenge, Circassian commander Jembulat Boletoqo made plans for a new campaign. General Zass sent Circassian commander Jembulat Boletoqo word in October 1836 that he wanted to make peace. Boletoqo considered the offer and decided to go.

Boletoqo visited Zass at his residence. For his initial visit, Zass was not present. Zass wrote him a letter and instructed him to come on a specific date when he would undoubtedly be in his residency. At the said date, Boletoqo was killed on non-warzone territory while on his way to the Prochnyi Okop fortress. The murderer was a Russian sniper employed by Zass, who was hiding in the forest on the Russian bank of the Kuban River, at the confluence with the Urup River. After this, in 1836, Zass was promoted again.

General Zass' main headquarters was in the Prochnyi Okop fortress. Ajgeri Kusikupsh, Shogen Shumaf and Khirtsizhiqo Ale of the Circassian army raided this base and kidnapped General Zass' daughter. They adopted the young girl as their own and taught her Circassian language and traditions. After three years, they sent Zass a letter in which they informed him that they were returning his daughter and agreed on the location and terms of delivery.

Circassian negotiators arrived on time and took the girl off the horse, dressed in a Circassian dress, and handed her over to her father. General Zass immediately wanted to order his army to kill all Circassians after receiving his daughter; however, the girl talked her father down, and both parties returned to their bases.

Reportedly, when Kusikupsh handed the girl over to her father, he said to General Zass, "The objective of this action was to make you understand the grief of fathers and mothers whose daughters were stolen or murdered by you through your own daughter. When the girl stayed with us, we would not fight you. But we'll be enemies again from now on".

In 1838, Zass spread false rumors about his serious illness, then staged his own death, weakening the Circassians' vigilance. On the same night, when the Circassians were celebrating their oppressor's death, the suddenly "resurrected" Zass launched a raid that destroyed two villages.

Between 1840 and 1841, he burned his last villages and built Russian villages on top of them. The punitive strategy of Zass and other Caucasian generals alienated the population and caused discontent in St. Petersburg. In 1842, Zass was removed from service in the Caucasus and because of the quarrel in 1842 with superiors, including Pavel Grabbe, he was forced to leave the Caucasus forever, and ultimately to resign in 1848.

Hungarian Revolution of 1848 

Tsar Nicholas I of Russia, in March 1849, recruited a Russian army, composed of about 8,000 soldiers, to assist Franz Joseph against the unrest in Hungary. In 1849 Zass returned to service and took part in the campaign in Hungary, commanding the Vanguard of the 3rd Corps. Russia invaded Transylvania on 8 April 1849. But as they crossed the Southern Carpathian mountain passes (along the border of Transylvania and Wallachia), they were met by a large Hungarian revolutionary army led by Józef Bem, a Polish-born General. Zass participated in the battles of Weitzen and Debrecen.

Zass then again left the service in 1864.

Reservist in Caucasian Army 
In recognition of his previous services, Emperor Alexander II ordered Zass to be enlisted in the service nominally in the Caucasian Army, and in 1877 he was promoted to the rank of general of cavalry.

Retirement 
Emperor Alexander II, wishing to honor the military exploits of Zass, called him back into service and promoted him to general of cavalry, commanding him to be listed in the Caucasian Army with the right to live wherever he wanted. Zass lived to a ripe old age and died at the age of 86. Šķēde Manor, Courland Governorate, Russian Empire (now Saldus, Latvia).

Racist views
Zass considered Circassians to be subhumans inferior to the "European Race", particularly Germans and Russians. The only way to deal with the Circassians, in his opinion, was to scare them away "just like wild animals". He kept a box under his bed with his collection of severed Circassian body parts.

Zass advocated ruthless military methods predicated on this notion, including burning people alive, cutting off heads for enjoyment, burning populated villages to the ground, spreading epidemics on purpose, and mass rape of children.

War crimes and genocidal actions

Methods of massacre of Circassians 
Colonel Grigory Zass was a key figure in the Circassian genocide through ethnic cleansing, which included methods such as burning entire Circassian villages, and deliberately causing epidemics. It is estimated that 70% of the East Circassian population died in the process.

Zass believed that there was no need to try to negotiate with the Circassians and therefore acted tough. His reports regularly say the following – "the village was exterminated to the ground", "those who resisted together with the village were committed to fire and sword", "the inhabitants of the village perished."

Zass sent severed Circassian heads to his friends in Berlin who were professors and used them to study anatomy. The Decembrist Nikolai Ivanovich Lorer (Лорер, Николай Иванович) said that Zass cleaned and boiled the flesh off the heads after storing them under his bed in his tent. He also had Circassian heads outside of his tent impaled on lances on a hill. Circassian men's corpses were decapitated by Russian-Cossack women on the battlefield after the battles were over for the heads to be sent to Zass for collection.

Zass erected Circassian heads on poles outside of his tent and witnesses report seeing wind blow their beards. Russian soldiers and Cossacks were paid for sending Circassian heads to Zass. Besides cutting Circassian heads off and collecting them, Zass employed a deliberate strategy of annihilating Circassian en masse, burning entire Circassian villages with the people in them and encouraging the rape of Circassian women and children. Zass' forces referred to all Circassian elderly, children women and men as "Bandits, "plunderers" or "thieves" and the Russian empire's forces were commanded by officers who commanded political dissidents and criminals.

Dismembering corpses 
In addition, it was recorded that Zass dismembered Circassian corpses, hid them as ornaments and sent them abroad to be used as test subjects. Zass especially sent severed Circassian heads to professors in Berlin, who used them to study anatomy.

Cutting pregnant women 
He would pick random Circassian males from the towns he attacked and burn them alive as a form of entertainment. He did not stop at burning women; he also cut the pregnant women's bellies with a bayonet.

Hobby of collecting heads and body parts 
Zass is said to have washed and cooked Circassian heads' flesh before putting them under his bed in his tent. He also had Circassian heads impaled on lances on a hill near his tent. After the battle, Circassian corpses were beheaded and the heads were sent to Zass for collection. Zass erected Circassian heads on poles outside of his tent and witnesses saw the wind blowing the beards of the heads. In addition, Russian soldiers and Cossacks were paid for sending Circassian heads to General Zass. He kept his personal collection of decapitated Circassian heads and body parts in a box under his bed.

Besides cutting Circassian heads off and collecting them, Zass used a premeditated policy of annihilating Circassians en masse, burning entire Circassian towns with their inhabitants and inciting the abuse of Circassian women and children. All Circassian elderly, women, and men were referred to as "bandits", "animals", "barbarians", "plunderers", or "thieves" by Zass' soldiers.

Advocacy of genocidal rape 
Russians, following Zass' methods, raped Circassian girls during the 1877 Russo-Turkish war from the Circassian refugees who were settled in the Ottoman Balkans.

Zass worked with another German officer in the Russian army named Georg Andreas von Rosen during the genocide against the Circassians. Zass wrote letters to Rosen proudly admitting he ordered Cossacks to slaughter Circassian civilians.

Legacy

Controversy 
Zass is depicted as the Devil or Satan in Circassian folklore.

In 2003, a monument to General Zass, as the founder of the city, was unveiled in the city of Armavir, Krasnodar Territory. The installation of the monument caused a sharply negative reaction of the Circassian society.

Establishments founded by him 
In the end of 1836, the Armenians of Circassia declared their allegiance for Russia and begged Zass to locate them a place to live. In 1839, Zass established an Armenian colony in the region that had previously belonged to the Circassians. To make room for the Armenians, Circassian villages and the people who lived in them were destroyed. This year is regarded the official year of Armavir's establishment.

By 1843, he founded the villages of Urupskaya, Voznesenskaya, Chemlykskaya and Labinskaya.
Zass's plans, however, extended even further. He developed a plan to strengthen the left bank of the Belaya River, to create powerful strongholds for the Russian army.

On August 26, 1904, the 1st Labinsky Regiment of the Kuban Cossack Army began to bear his name.

Sources 

1797 births
1883 deaths
Russian military personnel of the Caucasian War
Imperial Russian Army generals
War criminals
Genocidal rape
Mass murderers
German mass murderers
Russian mass murderers
Russian conspiracy theorists
Anti-Caucasus sentiment in Russia
Recipients of the Order of St. George
Russian soldiers
Russian people of German descent
Racial segregation
Racism in Russia
Racism in Europe
People of the Caucasian War
Circassian genocide perpetrators